Stigmella propalaea is a species of moth in the family Nepticulidae. It is endemic to New Zealand. This species is classified as "Data Deficient" by the Department of Conservation.

Taxonomy
This species was described by Edward Meyrick in 1889 using a specimen collected at Arthur's Pass at 600m above sea-level. Meyrick named the species Nepticula propalaea. George Hudson discussed this species under that name in his 1928 publication The Butterflies and Moths of New Zealand. In 1988 John S. Dugdale assigned this species to the genus Stigmella. The holotype specimen is held at the Natural History Museum, London. This species is only known from its holotype and the specimen is in poor condition.

Description
Meyrick described the species as follows:

Distribution
It is endemic to New Zealand. This species is only known from its type locality of Arthur's Pass.

Biology and behaviour 
The adult moths are on the wing in January. The female of this species has yet to be collected.

Conservation status 
This species has been classified as having the "Data Deficient" conservation status under the New Zealand Threat Classification System.

References

External links

Image of holotype species

Nepticulidae
Moths of New Zealand
Moths described in 1889
Taxa named by Edward Meyrick
Endemic fauna of New Zealand
Endemic moths of New Zealand